Manoel Ferraz de Campos Salles (15 February 1841 – 28 June 1913) was a  Brazilian lawyer, coffee farmer, and politician who served as the fourth president of Brazil. He was born in the city of Campinas, São Paulo. He graduated as a lawyer from the Faculdade de Direito do Largo de São Francisco, São Paulo, in 1863. He served as a provincial deputy three times, general-deputy once, and also as minister of justice (1889-1891), senator and  governor of São Paulo (1896–1897). The pinnacle of his political career was his election as president of Brazil, an office he held between 1898 and 1902. Austere financial reforms were adopted during his tenure.

He died in São Paulo on 28 June 1913.

See also
List of presidents of Brazil

References

External links
 

1841 births
1913 deaths
People from Campinas
Presidents of Brazil
Governors of São Paulo (state)
Brazilian farmers
19th-century Brazilian lawyers
University of São Paulo alumni
Brazilian newspaper founders
Republican Party of São Paulo politicians
Liberal Party (Brazil) politicians
Ministers of Justice of Brazil

Coffee with milk politics politicians